Louis L. Jabas (September 15, 1849 – June 21, 1896) was an American farmer and politician.

Background 
Born in Sanfords Four Corners, New York, Jabas moved to the town of Grand Chute, Outagamie County, Wisconsin in 1862, where he worked as a farmer. He served as Grand Chute Town Treasurer from 1875 to 1878 and chairman of the Grand Chute Town Board from 1885 to 1889. In From 1888 to 1890, Jabas served in the Wisconsin State Assembly as a Democrat.

Jabas died at his home in Appleton, Wisconsin.

Notes

1849 births
1896 deaths
People from Jefferson County, New York
People from Grand Chute, Wisconsin
Farmers from Wisconsin
Mayors of places in Wisconsin
19th-century American politicians
Democratic Party members of the Wisconsin State Assembly